The tumdak is a hand-struck double-headed membranophone of the Santal people of India and Bangladesh. Tumdak is a Santali famous instrument. Tumdak is used santali traditional festival.  The Santal typically use the Tumdak' in combination with the Tamah' for religious ceremonies and Santal festivals.  Both drums are almost universally played by men rather than women.  The body of the drum is cylindrical and made from clay.  The two heads of the drum are usually cowhide, the right one being slightly smaller than the left.  Like many similar Indian drums, each head has a round patch of tuning paste in the center which enhances the sound.  When played for dancing, the Tumdah' player suspends the drum around his neck with a cord or leather strap.  The Tumdah' falls within the larger category of double-headed hand-struck Indian drums, which have various names:  Dholak, Nal, Mridangam.  The player strikes the Tumdak' with full hand and fingers as required by the musical pattern.  The rhythm of the Tamak' and Tumdak' set the basic metric/rhythmic pattern for Santal dances and are essential for traditional Santal music.

See also
 Santal
 Santal music
 Music of India

References

Indian musical instruments
Directly struck membranophones